Egbert van Drielst (Groningen, 12 March 1745 – Amsterdam, 4 June 1818) began his study of the painting in a factory in Groningen which produced mainly lacquered objects. He soon went to Haarlem, where he became an apprentice in the wallpaper factory of Jan Augustini. Van Drielst entered the wallpaper studio in Amsterdam where he established friendships with Adriaan de Lelie. He studied the old masters Salomon van Ruysdael, Jacob van Ruisdael, Jan Wijnants and in particular, Meindert Hobbema, and sought to make use of their techniques in his nature studies. In 1768 he became a member of the Guild of Saint Luke in Amsterdam.

He often portrayed nature scenes of the Drenthe, in the north-east of the Netherlands. In 1790 he married a girl from Hoogeveen. He traveled there each year to produce drawings, and is sometimes called the "Drentse Hobbema". His wallpaper, usually with the horizon on eye height, can be seen in Elswout, near Haarlem and in the Rijksmuseum Twenthe.

Sources 
 Gerlagh, B & E. Koolhaas-Grosfeld (1995) Egbert van Drielst 1745-1818
 Mandle, E.R (1971) Dutch Masterpieces from the eighteenth century. Paintings & Drawings 1700 - 1800

External links 
  Website on the wallpaper in the Museum Geelvinck-Hinlopen Huis
 Codart on Adriaan de Lelie and Egbert van Drielst

1745 births
1818 deaths
18th-century Dutch painters
18th-century Dutch male artists
Dutch male painters
Dutch landscape painters
Painters from Groningen
Painters from Amsterdam
19th-century Dutch painters
19th-century Dutch male artists